S. Stephen's Church is an historic Episcopal church located at 114 George Street in the College Hill neighborhood of Providence, Rhode Island. Located in the midst of the Brown University campus, it is an active parish in the Episcopal Diocese of Rhode Island, with a strong Anglo-Catholic identity.

The church building, a large stone Gothic Revival structure, was designed by Richard Upjohn and built in 1860–62. In 1889 the congregation received a major bequest from Henry J. Steere, a prominent philanthropist and industrialist.

Its current rector is the Rev. Benjamin Pearce Straley, who was formerly Organist and Associate Director of Music of Washington National Cathedral.

The church building was listed on the U.S. National Register of Historic Places in 1973.

Rectors
 Francis Vinton, 1839–1840
 George Leeds, 1840–1841
 Henry Waterman, 1841–1845
 James H. Eames, 1845–1850
 Henry Waterman, 1850–1874
 Charles W. Ward, 1875–1877
 James W. Colwell, 1878–1884
 George McClellan Fiske, 1884–1919
 Frederick Spies Penfold, 1919–1926
 Frederic Fleming, 1927–1930
 Charles Townsend, Jr., 1930–1945
 Paul van K. Thomson, 1946–1949
 Warren R. Ward, 1949–1965
 Paul C. Kintzing, 1965–1976
 Livingston T. Merchant, 1977–1980
 Ronald P. Conner, 1981–1989
 David L. Stokes, Jr., 1991–1999
 John D. Alexander, 2000–2019
 Benjamin P. Straley

See also

National Register of Historic Places listings in Providence, Rhode Island

References

External links

Directory of historical material from Project Canterbury
150 Years on George Street, 2019 parish history edited by John Alexander, foreword by Richard Mammana
NRHP registration form

Churches completed in 1860
19th-century Episcopal church buildings
Churches on the National Register of Historic Places in Rhode Island
Episcopal churches in Rhode Island
Gothic Revival church buildings in Rhode Island
Historic American Buildings Survey in Rhode Island
National Register of Historic Places in Providence, Rhode Island
Anglo-Catholic church buildings in the United States
Historic district contributing properties in Rhode Island
1860 establishments in Rhode Island